Jonah is an Australian television drama series which aired for 20 episodes starting from 15 October 1962 on the Seven Network. Produced during an era when commercial television in Australia produced few dramatic series, Jonah was a period drama, and was inspired by the success of ABC's period drama mini-series like Stormy Petrel.

The episodes still exist.

Premise
The National Film and Sound Archive describes the series as a "historical drama series about Jonah Locke, a merchant trader in the early Australian colony". Jonah lived in Sydney between 1840 and 1850. He would encounter historical figures.

Regular cast
Brian James as Jonah Locke
Hilary Bamberger as Ann Parry, Jonah's housekeeper
Neil Fitzpatrick as Brett Hamilton, Jonah's nephew

Guest stars
Judith Arthy as Rosa
Denis Doonan as Captain Westcote
John Faasen as Sir John Franklin
Henry Gilbert as The Reverend Dr.
Ron Haddrick as Governor
Robert McPhee as Monahan
Moya O'Sullivan as Pompy
Lionel Pearcey as Ed Curr
Donald Philps as Captain Duff
Gwen Plumb as Lady Jane Franklin
Chris Christensen as Black Henry O'Brien
Richard Davies as Mathew Crawford
Claire Dunn as The Maid
Brett Hamilton as Neil Fitzpatrick
Brigid Lenihan as Kate Winslow 
Muriel Steinbeck as Caroline Chisolm

Background
In March 1962 it was announced ATN would make the series with Michael Plant to be writer and story editor, Harry Dearth to produce and David Cahill to direct. By July the lead actors had been cast. It was shot at Artransa Park Studios. Michael Plant was the writer and script editor.

The episode cost around £3,500 each. They sold to the Australian networks for £1,500 an episode and then to Britain for £1,000 an episode. There were disputes with Actors Equity over how much the actors should be paid.

Reception
One review called it "splendid".

The Women's Weekly called it "fast, action packed entertainment".

Select episodes
Ep 1 – "No Time for Despair" (w. Michael Plant) – gold is discovered in 1839 – guest starring Hans Farkash as Count Strzelecki, Ron Haddrick as Governor Gipps, Al Thomas, Owen Weingott (Stone Polonski)
Ep 2 – "A Tale of Two Bees" – the story of Benjamin Boyd who dreamed of building his own city – guest starring Colin Croft, Brigid Lenihan, John Faasen as Sir John Franklin Gwen Plumb as Lady Jane Franklin 
"A Ring Around a Rosa" – story of a young immigrant girl – guest star Muriel Steinbeck as Caroline Chisolm, Judith Artha as Rosa
"The Wrong Hands" – the story of Ludwig Leichardt – guest star Clement McCallin, Joe McCormick, Philip Ross
"Freedom for Port Phillip" – about John Dunmore Lang – guest star Henry Gilbert, John Llewellyn, Lionel Pearcey, Robert McPhee
"A Nest of Hornets" – about clash with Chinese migrants at Lambing Flat – guest star Allan Tobin as Lin Fong, Derek Barnes as Captain Zouch
"The Hashemy" – about the ship The Hashemy
"The Marquis of Mullambimbee" – the clash between William Wentworth and Henry Parkes – with James Condon, Keith Buckley, Bill Lewis
"Black Henry" – about a man who helped fix unemployment – with Brigid Lenihan, Chris Christensen, Richard Davies, Claire Dunn
"The Railroader" – Miles Morgan builds a railway in the Hunter Valley – with Wynn Roberts (Morgan), Vaughan Tracey as Jamey
"The Coal Mutiny" – a man leads a charge against the monopoly given to the Australian Agricultural Company – guest starring Tom Farley as James Brown, Moray Powell as Commodore Styles, Noeline Brown as Dorothea Styles
"Where is Adelaide?" – story of the planning of the city of Adelaide with Donald Phillips (as Captain Duff), John Barnard (as William Light), John Faasen (as Horton Depenn)
"The Seekers" – Puritans arrive in Australia on their way to New Zealand – guest starring Tanya Haylesworth as Purity Tunstall, Alan Herbert as John Tunstall
"The Damned Darlinghurst" – Jonah spends time in Darlinghurst Prison on a matter of principle – guest starring Al Thomas as Colonel Keck, Lyndall Barbour as Fairy Mortimer
"The Treaty of South Island" – the story of the formation of New Zealand – guest starring Harry Willis as a Maori chief Te Rauparaha, James Condon (William Wentworthh), Ron Haddrick (Governor Gipps)
"A Plague on Both Your Houses" – a romance between an emancipist's daughter and the son of an aristocratic gentleman – with Geoffrey King, Julianna Allan, Alexander Archdale, John Gregg
"Ship of Fame" – with Denis Doonan (Captain Westcote), Moya O'Sullivan (Pompy), Donald Philps (Captain Duff) 
"This Piece of Earth"
"The Man from Myall Creek" – last episode

See also
The Outcasts – a similar series which aired on ABC the previous year
Autumn Affair – an earlier attempt at television drama by Seven

References

External links

Jonah at National Film and Sound Archive

Australian drama television series
1962 Australian television series debuts
1963 Australian television series endings
Black-and-white Australian television shows
English-language television shows
Seven Network original programming
Period television series
Television shows set in colonial Australia